Lucjanów may refer to the following places:
Lucjanów, Łask County in Łódź Voivodeship (central Poland)
Lucjanów, Tomaszów Mazowiecki County in Łódź Voivodeship (central Poland)
Lucjanów, Masovian Voivodeship (east-central Poland)